Congo DR U-20 national football team, also known as Congo DR Under-20s or nicknamed Small Leopards, is the youth team for football in Congo DR. It plays a large role in the development of Congolaise football, and is considered to be the feeder team for the Congo DR national football team and is controlled by the Congolese Association Football Federation.

Recent results

Current squad
 The following players were called up for the 2023 Africa U-20 Cup of Nations qualification matches.
 Match dates: 8, 11 and 14 December 2022
 Opposition:''' ,  and

Achievements
Africa U-20 Cup of Nations: 1968, 1974

References

Democratic Republic of the Congo national football team
African national under-20 association football teams